Matthew Tees (13 October 1939 – 4 November 2020) was a Scottish footballer.

Originally a machinist at a carpet factory, he was discovered while playing for local leagues in Scotland with Cambuslang Rangers. After a spell with Airdrie, he played for Grimsby Town (two spells), Charlton Athletic and Luton Town before ending his career with Boston United in the Northern Premier League.

He died on 4 November 2020, at the age of 81.

Career
After beginning his career in the local leagues in Scotland with Cambuslang Rangers before joining professional football with Airdrie. He then joined Grimsby Town, Charlton Athletic, Luton Town and back to Grimsby Town, during his second spell at Grimsby, Tees was part of the 1971–72 team that won the Division Four title.

A 2017 BBC documentary on dementia among retired footballers included a visit to Tees' family home, where it was confirmed he had an advanced stage of the condition; it was suggested that the cause may be the high number of times he headed the ball during his playing career.

Honours

Club
Grimsby Town
Division Four Champions (1): 1971–72

References

External links

1939 births
2020 deaths
Footballers from Renfrewshire
Scottish footballers
Cambuslang Rangers F.C. players
Forfar Athletic F.C. players
Airdrieonians F.C. (1878) players
Grimsby Town F.C. players
Luton Town F.C. players
Boston United F.C. players
Charlton Athletic F.C. players
Scottish Football League players
English Football League players
Association football forwards
Scottish Junior Football Association players
People from Johnstone